Johan Emil Helkiö (1 October 1870 in Rauman maalaiskunta – 16 August 1941; original surname Hellman) was a Finnish farmer, lay preacher and politician. He was a member of the Parliament of Finland from 1907 to 1908, representing the Finnish Party.

References

1870 births
1941 deaths
People from Rauma, Finland
People from Turku and Pori Province (Grand Duchy of Finland)
Finnish Lutherans
Finnish Party politicians
Members of the Parliament of Finland (1907–08)